Augustine Nwagwu  (born 12 December 1996) is a Nigerian football striker playing with Górnik Piaski.

Club career
Born in Anambra,

In the seasons 2015–16 and 2016–17, he played in Poland with Orzeł Parzęczew. Although, during winter-break of the 2016–17 season, he signed with Austrian club Austria Klagenfurt. In summer 2017, he signed with Serbian First League side FK Metalac Gornji Milanovac During the winter-break of the 2017–18 season, he moved to FK Ibar playing in the Montenegrin Second League.

In summer 2018, he returned to Poland and joined lower league side Górnik Piaski.

References

1989 births
Living people
Sportspeople from Anambra State
Nigerian footballers
Nigerian expatriate footballers
Hamitköy S.K. players
Expatriate footballers in Northern Cyprus
CSF Bălți players
Expatriate footballers in Moldova
FC Kärnten players
Expatriate footballers in Austria
Expatriate footballers in Poland
FK Metalac Gornji Milanovac players
Serbian First League players
Expatriate footballers in Serbia
FK Ibar Rožaje players
Expatriate footballers in Montenegro
Association football forwards